Sorbulak is a lake in Ile District, Almaty Region, Kazakhstan.

The lake lies  NNW of Almaty, near the M-36 Highway. Along with a group of neighboring small lakes to the east, it collects sewage and industrial waste from the city. The lake formed in the period between 1975 and 1985, at the time of the Kazakh SSR government, following an official decision implemented in 1969.

In the 19th century , the lake was called Gorky.

Geography
Sorbulak is a lake located at the confluence of the Kurty and Kaskelen rivers in southeastern Kazakhstan. It lies in a natural hollow  to the WSW of the Kapchagay Reservoir. The water is fresh, but with a very high concentration of nitrates. There is one small island off the SE shore of the lake. In the second half of the summer Sorbulak becomes brackish owing to high evaporation. 

The lake is surrounded by semidesert and agricultural fields.

Flora and fauna
In most places reeds grow along the lakeshore. Sorbulak is an Important Bird Area for the breeding, migrating and wintering of a number of water bird species.

See also 
List of lakes of Kazakhstan

References

External links

 The role of planktonic algae in the ecological assessment of storage-reservoirs of the Ili-Balkhash basin
 Wastewater collector reservoirs in Kazakhstan: the Sorbulak system

Lakes of Kazakhstan
Almaty Region
Artificial lakes
Important Bird Areas of Kazakhstan